Nelson Mandela High School may refer to:

 Nelson Mandela High School, in Waterloo, Sierra Leone
 Nelson Mandela High School in Calgary, Alberta, Canada

See also
Nelson Mandela School (disambiguation)